Tomasz Kłos (born 7 March 1973) is a Polish former football defender.

Club career
Kłos was born in Zgierz. At club level, he played for ŁKS Łódź (1995–1998), AJ Auxerre (1998–2000), 1. FC Kaiserslautern (2000–2003), 1. FC Köln (2003), Wisła Kraków (2003–2006) and in 2006 returned to ŁKS Łódź where he played until retiring in 2008.

International career
For Poland, Kłos appeared 69 times, scoring six goals. He captained his country and played for Poland at the 2002 FIFA World Cup. Along with Jerzy Dudek, Tomasz Rzasa and Tomasz Frankowski, Klos was a surprise omission from his country's squad for the 2006 FIFA World Cup.

International goals
Source:

References

1973 births
Living people
People from Zgierz
Sportspeople from Łódź Voivodeship
Association football defenders
Polish footballers
Poland international footballers
ŁKS Łódź players
AJ Auxerre players
1. FC Kaiserslautern players
1. FC Köln players
Wisła Kraków players
Ekstraklasa players
Ligue 1 players
Bundesliga players
Polish expatriate footballers
Expatriate footballers in Germany
Expatriate footballers in France
2002 FIFA World Cup players